Wu Jingxuan or Jane Wu, formerly known as Hu Mengyuan or Melrose Hu, is a Chinese actress, producer and fashion designer.

As Hu Mengyuan (Melrose Hu), she debuted as a female killer in the movie No Limit in 2011, and starred in Angel Warriors in 2013. In 2013, she was named "Top Ten Sexiest Female Agents" along with Fan Bingbing, Tang Wei, and Shu Qi. She starred in the 2014 film Ameera.

After moving to Hollywood, she changed her names to Jane Wu and Wu Jingxuan, and produced and appeared in several films.

Filmography

References

External links 

Living people
21st-century Chinese actresses
Chinese film producers
Chinese film actresses
1989 births